REBEL - Revolutionære Unge Socialister (Revolutionary Young Socialists) was an independent Danish far-left youth organisation founded in 1992. In 2001, REBEL joined forces with the youth network of the Red-Green Alliance / Enhedslisten and established Socialist Youth Front.

External links
Article on Rebel at leksikon.org- In Danish

Political youth organizations based in Denmark
Socialism in Denmark
Youth organizations established in 1992
Organizations disestablished in 2001